Stăuceni is a commune in Botoșani County, Western Moldavia, Romania. It is composed of four villages: Siliștea, Stăuceni, Tocileni, and Victoria.

Natives
 Teoctist Arăpașu

References

Communes in Botoșani County
Localities in Western Moldavia